Gardabad (also Romanized as Gardābād; also known as Garūābād) is an ancient Armenian village in nowadays Nazluy-ye Jonubi Rural District, in the Central District of Urmia County, West Azerbaijan Province, contemporary Iran (Islamic Republic of Iran). At the 2006 census, its population was 537, in 127 families, mainly Christian Armenians.

References 

Populated places in Urmia County